Webster K. "Web" Cavenee (born 1951) is the Director of Strategic Alliances in Central Nervous System Cancers at the Ludwig Institute for Cancer Research and Distinguished Professor at the University of California, San Diego.
He was the Director of the Ludwig Institute for Cancer Research until 2015 when it was taken over by Richard Kolodner. His laboratory studies gene mutations in cancer, most notably in EGFR and glioblastoma multiforme.

He joined Ludwig in 1985 after doing postdoctoral fellowships at Jackson Laboratory, MIT, and University of Utah. He became the director in 1991.

Awards 
 2014 AACR-Margaret Foti Award for Leadership and Extraordinary Achievements in Cancer Research
 2013 Elected Fellow of the American Association for Cancer Research Academy
 2012 Elected to the Leopoldina German Academy of Science
 2008 Elected Fellow, American Association for the Advancement of Science
 2007 Elected to the Institute of Medicine
 2007 AACR-Princess Takamatsu Award
 2007 Albert Szent-Gyorgyi Prize, National Foundation for Cancer Research
 2003 Elected Fellow, National Foundation for Cancer Research
 1998 President, AACR
 1997 Elected Fellow, American Academy of Microbiology
 1997 Elected Member of the National Academy of Sciences
 1994 Farber Prize, American Association of Neurological Surgeons
 1994-1997 Board of Directors, AACR
 1990 Charles S. Mott Prize, General Motors Cancer Research Foundation
 1988 Award for Outstanding Achievement in Cancer Research (Rhoads Prize), AACR

References 

1951 births
Living people
American oncologists
University of California, San Diego faculty
Members of the German Academy of Sciences Leopoldina
Members of the United States National Academy of Sciences
Members of the National Academy of Medicine
Fellows of the AACR Academy
Foreign members of the Chinese Academy of Engineering